Love Is Not Blind is a 2011 Chinese romantic comedy film directed by Teng Huatao. The film was adapted from an online novel written by Bao Jingjing which has been popular among cyber users since its appearance. Due to the popularity of the source, Teng adapted the novel into a movie, which was said to be prepared specially for Nov.11—the Singles' Day in China. The film became a major commercial success in China, considering its low budget.  Now Teng is considering adapting the novel into a TV play.

Plot
Huang Xiaoxian, a 27-year-old woman who lives in Beijing, breaks up with her boyfriend of 7 years after witnessing him on a date with her best friend in a shopping mall. Heart-broken and depressed, Xiaoxian mopes around at work and nearly gets fired for screwing up a big assignment.  With the surprising help from a colleague she usually loathes, Xiaoxian gradually heals, starts to see more truly of herself, and finds love from someone who has always been there for her.

Cast 
Bai Baihe as Huang Xiaoxian
Wen Zhang as Wang Xiaojian (Wang Yiyang)
Zhang Jiayi as Da Laowang
Guo Jingfei as Lu Ran
Wang Yaoqing as Wei Yiran
Zhang Zixuan as Li Ke
Cao Cuifen as Aunt Zhang
Wei Zongwan as Uncle Chen
Hai Qing as Aunt Zhang (youth)
Liao Fan as Uncle Chen (youth)
Li Nian as Cello teacher
Jiao Junyan as Feng Jiaqi

Theme song 
Love Song, sung by Chen Shanni, with lyrics and music by her as well, was first included in Chen's album Later, we all cried in 2004.

Accolades and nominations 
49th Taipei Golden Horse Film Festival
 Best Actress Nomination - Hehe Bai
 Best New Actress - Zixuan Zhang
 Best Soundtrack Nomination - Chaoyang Lin, Wei Ding
 Best Cinematography Nomination - Dun Cao
 Best Adapted Screenplay - Jingjing Bao

References

2011 films
2011 romantic comedy films
Chinese romantic comedy films
Films based on Chinese novels
Films directed by Teng Huatao
2010s Mandarin-language films